Miriam Naveira de Merly (July 28, 1934 – April 15, 2018) was a Puerto Rican jurist who served in the Supreme Court of Puerto Rico from 1985 to 2004. Naveira was the first woman to serve on the court as well as the first female Chief Justice (2003-2004).

Biography
Naveira was born in Santurce, Puerto Rico, in 1934. She obtained her bachelor's degree in chemistry from the College of Mount Saint Vincent and her law degree from the University of Puerto Rico.

Naveira was appointed to the Supreme Court in 1985 by Governor Rafael Hernández Colón, becoming the first woman on that court. During her tenure, Naveira was known as a pragmatic and moderate justice.

After the retirement of Chief Justice José Andreu García in 2003, Governor Sila Calderón elevated Justice Naveira to the post of Chief Justice. However, her tenure lasted only seven months since the Constitution of Puerto Rico states that Supreme Court Justices must retire at the age of seventy. Chief Justice Miriam Naveira retired in July 2004. She was succeeded by her colleague Federico Hernández Denton.

Her daughter Miriam Rodón Naveira is an environmental scientist working at the federal government of the United States which was awarded a Silver Medal for Superior Service and a Suzanne Olive EEO and Diversity Award both by the EPA.  She was also the first Hispanic woman to serve as branch chief of the EPA's National Exposure Research Laboratory (NERL) and later the first Hispanic woman to become deputy director of NERL's Environmental Sciences Division.

See also

List of Hispanic/Latino American jurists
List of Puerto Ricans
History of women in Puerto Rico

References

|-

1934 births
2018 deaths
20th-century American judges
20th-century Puerto Rican lawyers
20th-century American women judges
Associate Justices of the Supreme Court of Puerto Rico
Chief Justices of the Supreme Court of Puerto Rico
College of Mount Saint Vincent alumni
Constitutional court women judges
Hispanic and Latino American judges
People from Santurce, Puerto Rico
University of Puerto Rico alumni
Women chief justices